Wanhua is a station in Wanhua District, Taipei, Taiwan, served by Taiwan Railways Administration  .

Overview

The station is divided into east and west buildings. The station entrance, lobby, and ticket counters are located in the west building. The station exit, parcel center, and offices are located in the east building. The station is equipped with one island platform and one side platform, both underground.

History
It was located at the intersection of modern-day Zhonghua Rd. and Aiguo W. Rd.
1 July 1918: The station location was moved west to its current location.
24 March 1954: The Xindian line ceased operations.
19 September 1988: As part of the Wanban Project (萬板專案) construction, the station front was changed.
21 July 1999: After the tracks were moved underground as part of the Taipei Railway Underground Project, the new east and west buildings began service.

Platform configuration

Around the Station
Night Markets
 Meng Xia Night Market (400m to the northwest)
 Guangzhou Street Night Market (600m to the northwest)
 Snake Alley (750m to the northwest)
 Zhixing Market (700m to the north)
 Shuang He Market (750m to the south)
 Bangka Old Street (850m to the north)
 Nanjichang Night Market (1km to the southeast)
 Fuxing Xiyuan Shopping District (1.1km to the southwest)
Parks
 Mengjia Park (450m to the north)
 Laosong Park (650m to the northeast)
 Taipei Botanical Garden (1km to the southeast)
 Youth Park (1.2km to the southeast)
 The Red House (1.4km to the northeast)
 Shuangyuan Riverside Park (1.5km to the west)
Metro Stations
 Taipei Metro Longshan Temple Station (300m to the north)
 Taipei Metro Xiaonanmen Station (1.2km to the northeast)
Temples
 Bangka Lungshan Temple (450m to the north)
Schools
 Mengjia Junior High School (600m to the south)
 Xiyuan Elementary School (1km to the south)
 Shuangyuan Elementary School (450m to the southwest)
Historical Sites
 Nanhai Academy (1.4km to the southeast)
 Wanhua Lin Mansion (200m to the west)
 Bopiliao Historical Block (500m to the northeast)
 Nishi Honganji Relics (1.3km to the northeast)

Government Offices
 Wanhua District Administrative Center (100m to the north)

See also
 List of railway stations in Taiwan

References

External links

TRA Wanhua Station
Taiwan Railways Administration

1901 establishments in Taiwan
Railway stations in Taipei
Railway stations opened in 1901
Railway stations served by Taiwan Railways Administration